Kaito Hamada (born 14 October 1999) is a Japanese snowboarder. He competed at the 2022 Winter Olympics.

Career
Hamada competed at the 2021 World Championships in the big air and slopestyle events, where he finished in fifth place in both events.
 

He represented Japan at the 2022 Winter Olympics in the slopestyle event and finished in eighth place.

References

1999 births
Living people
Japanese male snowboarders
Snowboarders at the 2022 Winter Olympics
Olympic snowboarders of Japan
Sportspeople from Sapporo
21st-century Japanese people